is a Japanese politician and lawyer who has served in the House of Councillors since 2007, and as Minister of Justice from October 2019 to September 2020. She is a member of the Liberal Democratic Party.

Early life 

Masako Mori was born on August 22, 1964, to an impoverished family in Fukushima Prefecture. She decided to pursue a career as a lawyer after her father, who had lost his entire fortune, was saved by a lawyer. She graduated from Tohoku University in 1988. After working in a legal cram school, she passed the Japanese bar examination on her fifth attempt, and qualified as an attorney at law in 1995.

After three years practicing consumer rights law, she was selected for a Japan Federation of Bar Associations scholarship to study in the United States. She was a visiting fellow at the New York University School of Law starting in 1999. Following the birth of her second child in 2002, and her husband being transferred to a position in the United States for two years, she left law practice to become a housewife.

In 2005, she joined the Financial Services Agency, where she served as a deputy director and financial inspector.

Political career 
Mori resigned from the Financial Services Agency in 2006 to run for governor of Fukushima Prefecture following the resignation of Eisaku Sato. She lost this election to Yuhei Sato.

She won a seat in the 2007 House of Councillors election, and served as vice chairwoman of the LDP's judicial committee and chairwoman of the Upper House Committee on Oversight of Administration. Following the March 2011 Tohoku earthquake and tsunami, she put great effort in trying to restore the damaged territories of her native Tohoku region.

Following the LDP's victory in the 2012 general election, Mori was named to the second Cabinet of Prime Minister Shinzo Abe as Minister of State for the Declining Birthrate and consumer affairs.

She was re-elected in the 2013 election, and held her seat in a three-way race in the July 2019 election, during which she campaigned to decommission all nuclear reactors in Fukushima Prefecture.

Minister of Justice 
Mori was appointed Minister of Justice in October 2019 after the resignation of Katsuyuki Kawai, who had been involved in a campaign finance scandal.

After former Nissan chairman Carlos Ghosn escaped from Japan while awaiting trial on criminal charges, Mori publicly stated that he should "prove his innocence," but later retracted the comment and apologized. She also defended Japanese interrogation and detention practices against public criticism.

In February 2020, she defended the Cabinet's decision to delay the retirement of top Tokyo prosecutor Hiromu Kurokawa, which the opposition criticized as illegal.

In March 2020, she apologized and retracted a comment accusing public prosecutors of fleeing from her home city of Iwaki before evacuation orders were issued amid the 2011 Tōhoku earthquake and tsunami.

Personal life 

References

External links 
  

1964 births
Living people
Female members of the House of Councillors (Japan)
Female justice ministers
Japanese women lawyers
Liberal Democratic Party (Japan) politicians
Members of the House of Councillors (Japan)
Ministers of Justice of Japan
Politicians from Fukushima Prefecture
Tohoku University alumni
Women government ministers of Japan
21st-century Japanese women politicians
21st-century Japanese politicians